The Centre for High Energy Systems and Sciences (CHESS) is an Indian defence laboratory of the Defence Research and Development Organisation (DRDO). Located in Hyderabad, Telangana, it conducts research on high energy weapons.

References

Defence Research and Development Organisation laboratories
Research and development in India
Education in Hyderabad, India
Year of establishment missing